The Yaroslavl Oblast Duma is the regional parliament of Yaroslavl Oblast, a federal subject of Russia. A total of 50 deputies are elected for five-year terms.

Elections

2018

See also
List of chairmen of Yaroslavl Oblast Duma

References

Yaroslavl Oblast
Politics of Yaroslavl Oblast